Mayo Abbey may refer to:

Monastery of Mayo, a medieval abbey
Mayo, County Mayo, village also known as Mayo Abbey